The 1988 Republican National Convention was held in the Louisiana Superdome in New Orleans, Louisiana, from August 15 to August 18, 1988. It was the second time that a major party held its convention in one of the five states known as the Deep South, coming on the heels of the 1988 Democratic National Convention, which was held in Atlanta, Georgia. Much of the impetus for holding the convention in the Superdome came from the Louisiana Republican National Committeewoman Virginia Martinez of New Orleans, who lobbied on behalf of her adopted home city as the convention site as a member of the RNC Executive Committee.

The convention nominated Vice President George Bush for president, as expected. The second spot on the ticket was not publicly known before the convention; James Danforth "Dan" Quayle, U.S. Senator from Indiana, was selected as Bush's vice presidential running mate. The revelation of Quayle's selection as running mate did not come until the second day of the convention, when NBC News broke the story. As of 2020, it was the last time a major party's presidential candidate announced his vice presidential choice during his party's convention.

The convention featured speeches by Joe Paterno, Pat Robertson, a keynote address by New Jersey Governor Thomas Kean, and the music of the Jimmy Maxwell Orchestra. Actress Helen Hayes attended the conference at age 88.

Speakers

The convention is perhaps best known for Bush's "thousand points of light" speech accepting the nomination. Written by Peggy Noonan and Craig R. Smith, it included the "read my lips: no new taxes" pledge that was the most popular sound bite coming out of the convention. The successful speech gave him a "bounce" that he was able to capitalize on to win the 1988 presidential election.

President Ronald and Nancy Reagan were honored on August 15. Reagan made a major speech on the opening night of the convention, as he would for the last time in 1992.

Other speakers included Bob Dole, Elizabeth Dole, Arizona junior senator John McCain, Jeane Kirkpatrick and former President Gerald Ford.

Voting
The Balloting:
{| border='1px' class="wikitable" style="text-align:center;"
! colspan=1| Candidates 
|  
|-
| align=right | Name
| George H. W. Bush
|-
| align=right |Certified Votes
| 2,044 (100%)
|-
|align=right |total: ||2,044'|-
|}
With rumblings of opposition to the Quayle nomination, it was decided to have it ratified by voice vote, something that the Republicans had never done before, but would become standard practice in the decades to come.  

See also
1988 Republican Party presidential primaries
George H. W. Bush 1988 presidential campaign
History of the United States Republican Party
List of Republican National Conventions
U.S. presidential nomination convention
1987 Libertarian National Convention
1988 Democratic National Convention
1988 United States presidential election

References

External links

 George Bush's nomination acceptance speech for President at RNC (video) at C-SPAN George Bush's nomination acceptance speech for President at RNC (audio) 
 Video of Quayle nomination acceptance speech for Vice President at RNC (via YouTube)
 George Bush's nomination acceptance speech for President at RNC (text) at The American Presidency Project Republican Party platform of 1988 at The American Presidency Project''
 Video (with audio) of Thomas Kean's Keynote Address at Republican National Convention
 Text of Thomas Kean's Keynote Address at Republican National Convention

 
Republican National Conventions
Republican National Convention, 1988
1988 United States presidential election
1988 in Louisiana
1988 conferences
August 1988 events in the United States